Waterville Township may refer to the following townships in the United States:

 Waterville Township, Le Sueur County, Minnesota
 Waterville Township, Lucas County, Ohio